The Men's Giant Slalom in the 2023 FIS Alpine Skiing World Cup is scheduled to consist of ten events including the final. Defending discipline champion Marco Odermatt of Switzerland opened over a 100-point lead in the discipline by winning four of the first five races and finishing third in the other, although he then missed a race due to injury. Odermatt clinched the discipline championship by winning both giant slaloms on 11-12 March in Kranjska Gora, Slovenia.

The season was interrupted by the 2023 World Ski Championships in the linked resorts of Courchevel and Méribel, France from 6–19 February 2023. Although the Alpine Skiing branch of the International Ski Federation (FIS) conducts both the World Cup and the World Championships, the World Championships are organized by nation (a maximum of four skiers is generally permitted per nation), and (after 1970) the results count only for World Championship medals, not for World Cup points. Accordingly, the results in the World Championship are highlighted in blue and shown in this table by ordinal position only in each discipline. The men's giant slalom was held in Courchevel on 17 February.

The World Cup final took place on Saturday, 18 March 2023, in Soldeu, Andorra. Only the top 25 skiers in the World Cup giant slalom discipline and the winner of the Junior World Championship in the discipline, plus any skiers who have scored at least 500 points in the World Cup overall classification for the season, were eligible to compete in the final, and only the top 15 finishers earned World Cup points in the discipline.

Standings

Legend

DNQ = Did Not Qualify for run 2
DNF1 = Did Not Finish run 1
DSQ1 = Disqualified run 1
DNF2 = Did Not Finish run 2
DSQ2 = Disqualified run 2
DNS2 = Did Not Start run 2

Updated at 18 March 2023 after all events.

See also
 2023 Alpine Skiing World Cup – Men's summary rankings
 2023 Alpine Skiing World Cup – Men's Overall
 2023 Alpine Skiing World Cup – Men's Downhill
 2023 Alpine Skiing World Cup – Men's Super-G
 2023 Alpine Skiing World Cup – Men's Slalom
 World Cup scoring system

References

External links
 Alpine Skiing at FIS website

Men's giant slalom
FIS Alpine Ski World Cup men's giant slalom discipline titles